Galagete pecki is a moth in the family Autostichidae. It was described by Bernard Landry in 2002. It is found on the Galápagos Islands.

Subspecies
Galagete pecki pecki
Galagete pecki flavofasciata Schmitz & Landry, 2005

References

Moths described in 2002
Galagete